Made in China is the seventh album by Juliana Hatfield, released in 2005.

Track listing

Personnel
 Juliana Hatfield – vocals, guitar, bass guitar, drums
 Joe Keefe – guitar
 Ben Smith – bass guitar
 Ed Valauskas – bass guitar
 Pete Caldes – drums
 Sebastian Keefe – drums

Production
Producer: Juliana Hatfield
Engineer: Brian Brown and Paul Q. Kolderie
Mixing: Brian Brown and Paul Q. Kolderie
Mastering: Greg Calbi
Design: Mary Lynch
Photography and Artwork: Juliana Hatfield

Juliana Hatfield albums
2005 albums